Rhinoncomimus is a genus of minute seed weevils in the family of beetles known as Curculionidae. There are about eight described species in Rhinoncomimus.

Species
These eight species belong to the genus Rhinoncomimus:
 Rhinoncomimus continuus Huang, Yoshitake & Zhang, 2013 c g
 Rhinoncomimus fukienensis Wagner, 1940 c
 Rhinoncomimus klapperichi Wagner, 1940 c
 Rhinoncomimus latipes Korotyaev c b (mile-a-minute weevil)
 Rhinoncomimus niger Chûjô & Morimoto, 1959 c
 Rhinoncomimus rhytidosomoides Korotyaev, 1997 c g
 Rhinoncomimus robustus Voss, 1958 c
 Rhinoncomimus rubripes Korotyaev, 2006 c
Data sources: i = ITIS, c = Catalogue of Life, g = GBIF, b = Bugguide.net

References

Further reading

External links

 

Baridinae